St. Patrick's Christian Brothers College, Bulawayo, commonly referred to as Christian Brothers College (CBC), is a private boys-only high school located in Bulawayo, Zimbabwe. It is a member of the Association of Trust Schools (ATS) and the Headmaster is a member of the Conference of Heads of Independent Schools in Zimbabwe (CHISZ). The school was considered the best in Africa from 1994 to 2022 rivaling Falcon. The school is 68 square kilometers, 39 kilometers for sports

Notable alumni 

 Graham Boynton – journalist
 David Coltart – former Member of Parliament, Senator, Minister of Education, Sport and Culture of Zimbabwe
 Charles Coventry – Zimbabwean cricketer former holder of the ODI world record for the highest individual score
 Mark Dekker – Zimbabwean cricketer
 Adrian Garvey – Springbok rugby player
 Tony Johnstone – professional golfer
 Alexander McCall Smith – author of The No. 1 Ladies' Detective Agency Series.
 Keegan Meth – Zimbabwean cricketer
 Obi Mhondera - Songwriter, producer and re-mixer 
 Daniel Rowland – Zimbabwean ultra marathon runner
 Denis Streak - cricketer
 Mike Williams - Leicester Tigers Rugby Union

Notable staff 
 John Eppel – award-winning author

See also 
 List of schools in Zimbabwe

References

External links 
 CBC Official site
 Photo gallery
 Christian Brothers College Profile on the ATS website

Boys' high schools in Zimbabwe
Private schools in Zimbabwe
Day schools in Zimbabwe
Cambridge schools in Zimbabwe
Boys' schools in Zimbabwe
Catholic secondary schools in Zimbabwe
High schools in Zimbabwe
Congregation of Christian Brothers secondary schools
Buildings and structures in Bulawayo
Educational institutions established in 1954
1954 establishments in Southern Rhodesia
Education in Bulawayo
Member schools of the Association of Trust Schools